Quebec Run is a  long 3rd order tributary to Big Sandy Creek in Fayette County, Pennsylvania.  This is the only stream of this name in the United States.

Variant names
According to the Geographic Names Information System, it has also been known historically as:
Mill Run

Course
Quebec Run rises about 2 miles northeast of Wymps Gap, Pennsylvania, and then flows east and southeast to join Big Sandy Creek about 4 miles southwest of Elliottsville.

Watershed
Quebec Run drains  of area, receives about 50.9 in/year of precipitation, has a wetness index of 320.85, and is about 94% forested.

See also
List of rivers of Pennsylvania

References

Rivers of Pennsylvania
Rivers of Fayette County, Pennsylvania